You Gotta Love That! is the fourth studio album released by American country music artist Neal McCoy, released in 1995 on Atlantic Records. It includes the singles "For a Change", "They're Playin' Our Song", "If I Was a Drinkin' Man", and the title track. Of these, all but "If I Was a Drinkin' Man" were Top 5 hits on the Billboard Hot Country Singles & Tracks (now Hot Country Songs) charts.

Track listing

Personnel
Eddie Bayers - drums
Barry Beckett - keyboards
Paul Franklin - steel guitar
Neal McCoy - lead vocals
Terry McMillan - percussion
Phil Naish - keyboards
Bobby Ogdin - keyboards
Donny Parenteau - fiddle, mandolin
Don Potter - acoustic guitar
Michael Rhodes - bass guitar
Brent Rowan - electric guitar
John Wesley Ryles - background vocals
Harry Stinson - background vocals
Dennis Wilson - background vocals 
Curtis Young - background vocals

Charts

Weekly charts

Year-end charts

Certifications

References

1995 albums
Albums produced by Barry Beckett
Atlantic Records albums
Neal McCoy albums